Demetrio Franco (1443–1525) was an Albanian historian. He was a close accomplice of Skanderbeg, later publishing works on his life.

Life
Franco was born in Drivasto in 1443 to a Catholic family. Through his mother he was a cousin of Pal Engjëlli, the Archbishop of Durrës and a close collaborator of Scanderbeg. In 1466 he accompanied Skanderbeg in Rome as a scribe. In 1479 after Shkodër was conquered by the Ottoman Empire he migrated to Italy, where he served as vicar until his death in Trevi in 1525.

Service and work
Franco himself accompanied Skanderbeg to Italy in the winter of 1466–1467. Following his death in 1468, Franco moved to Tivar, and then to Venice. In April 1480, he published a biography of Skanderbeg in Latin at the printing house of German Erhard Ratdolf.

His most notable piece work is considered to be Gli illustri e gloriosi gesti e vittoriose imprese fatte contro i Turchi dal Signor Don Georgio Castriotto detto Scanderbeg, principe d' Epiro, along with the aforementioned biography of Skanderbeg.

Sources
 Demetrio Franco : "Gli illustri et gloriosi gesti et vittoriose imprese cobtra Turchi fatte dal Signor Giorgio Castriotto detto Scanderbeg principe di Epiro, (manuscript, 1480), Italian translation 1584, in Venice.
 Paolo Jovio : "Commentario delle cose de Turchi et del Signor Gorgio Scanderbeg, prencipe d'Epirro., Venice, 1539.
 Jaques De Lavardin, Histoire de Georges Castriote surnommé Scanderbeg Roi d'Albanie, Paris 1576". 
 Jean Nicolas Duponcet : "Histoire de Scanderbeg Roy d'Albanie", 
Paris 1709.
 R.P. Duponcet : "Les exploits heroïque de Scanderbeg Roi d'Albanie, 
Liège, 1854. 
 Anonimo di Palermo : "Storia di Giorgio Castriotto sopranomminato Scanderbeg, principe d'Albania, Palermo, 1847.
 C.C. Moore, George Castriot Scanderbeg, King of Albania, 1850.
 Fan Stillian Noli : " Historia e' Sknderbeut§", Tirana, 1924. 
 Harry Hodkinson Scanderbeg, London, 1999.
 Lek Pervizi,  translator,  of  Veprat e Lavdishme te Skenderbeut Of Dmetrius Francus, Tirana, 2005
Lek Pervizi,  Scanderbeg, Album commemoratif, Bruxelles, 2018

References 

15th-century births
15th-century deaths
People from Shkodër County
16th-century Albanian Roman Catholic priests
16th-century Albanian historians
15th-century Albanian Roman Catholic priests
15th-century Albanian historians